Seitz is a surname. Those bearing it include:

A 

 Adalbert Seitz (1860–1938), German doctor and natural scientist
 Adolf Seitz (1898–1970), German–Argentine chess master
 Albert Seitz (1872–1937), French composer
  ( – ), Swiss-German physician and lieutenant of Luther and Zwingli 
 Alexander Maximilian Seitz (1811–1888), German painter
 Andy Seitz (born 1985), American pair skater

B 

 Beat Seitz (born 1973), Swiss bobsledder
 Bernarda Seitz (1927–2014), Argentine nun, writer, and presenter
 Berthold Seitz (born 1962) German ophthalmologist
 Bill Seitz (born 1954), member of the Ohio Senate

C 

 Chris Seitz (born 1987), American soccer player.
 Collins J. Seitz (1914–1998), American judge
 Collins J. Seitz, Jr., American judge and son of the above.
 Don Carlos Seitz (1862–1935), American newspaper manager

E 

 Ernest Seitz (1892–1978), Canadian composer

F 

 Florian Seitz (born 1982), German athlete

 Franz Seitz, Sr. (1887–1952), German film director
 Franz Seitz, Jr. (1920–2006), German film producer
 Frederick Seitz (1911–2008), US physicist (solid state physics)
 Friedrich "Fritz" Seitz (1848–1918), German violinist, composer

G 

 Gary Seitz, (born 1943), mathematician
 George Seitz (1894–1976), American murder victim
 George Seitz (politician) (born 1941), member of the Victorian Legislative Assembly
 George A. Seitz (1897–1947), US navy officer
 George B. Seitz (1888–1944), US screenwriter, actor, and director

H 

 Hermann Seitz (1902–1942), German army officer

J 

 Jane Seitz (1942–1988), German film editor
 Jochen Seitz (born 1976), German footballer
 John A. Seitz, Brigadier General, Commander of the 1st Infantry Division and the XVIII Airborne Corps
 John F. Seitz (1892–1979), US cameraman
 John F. R. Seitz (1908-1978), US Major General, Commander of 2nd Infantry Division

L 
 Ludwig Seitz (1844–1908), also known as Ludovico Seitz, was an Italian painter

K 
 Kari Seitz (born 1970), American soccer referee
 Karl Seitz (1869–1950), Austrian politician
 Konrad Seitz (born 1934), German diplomat

M 

 Mark J. Seitz (born 1954), American bishop in the Catholic Church
 Michael Seitz (born 1959), American professional wrestler better known as Michael Hayes

P 

 Patricia A. Seitz (born 1946), American judge
 Patrick Seitz (born 1978), American voice actor
 Paul Seitz (1906–1984), French bishop in the Catholic Church
 Paul Seitz (trainer) (1897–1979), French footballer
 Peter Seitz (born 1931), German-born graphic designer
 Peter Seitz (1905–1983), American jurist who issued the 1975 Seitz decision, impacting Major League Baseball's reserve clause

R 

 Raymond G. H. Seitz (born 1940), U.S. Ambassador to the United Kingdom
 Richard J. Seitz, Lieutenant General, Commander of the 82nd Airborne Division and the XVIII Airborne Corps
 Roland F. Seitz (1867–1946), American composer

T 
 Thomas Seitz (born 1967), German politician

V 

 Virginia A. Seitz (born 1956), American attorney

W 

 Wilhelm Seitz (1904–1987), German politician (FDP)

See also 
 Zajc
 Zeitz (surname)

References

German-language surnames
Surnames from given names
da:Seitz
de:Seitz
es:Seitz
fr:Seitz
it:Seitz
nl:Seitz
ja:ザイツ
pl:Seitz
pt:Seitz
ru:Зайтц
sk:Seitz
fi:Seitz